The 24 Preludes and Fugues, Op. 87 by Dmitri Shostakovich are a set of 24 musical pieces for solo piano, one in each of the major and minor keys of the chromatic scale. The cycle was composed in 1950 and 1951 while Shostakovich was in Moscow, and premiered by pianist Tatiana Nikolayeva in Leningrad in December 1952; it was published the same year. A complete performance takes approximately 2 hours and 32 minutes. It is one of several examples of music written in all major and/or minor keys.

Form and structure

Each piece is in two parts—a prelude and a fugue—varying in pace, length and complexity (for example, Fugue No. 13 in F major is in five voices, while Fugue No. 9 in E major is in only two voices).

The pieces proceed in relative major/minor pairs around the circle of fifths: first C major and A minor (prelude and fugue nos. 1 and 2), then to one sharp (G major, E minor), two sharps (D major, B minor), and so on, ending with D minor (1 flat). Chopin's 24 Preludes, Op. 28, and Shostakovich's own earlier 24 Preludes, Op. 34 are organized in the same way.

Relationship to Bach's The Well-Tempered Clavier
J.S. Bach's The Well-Tempered Clavier, an earlier set of 48 preludes and fugues, are widely held to be the direct inspiration for Shostakovich's cycle, largely based on the work's composition history.

References to and quotations from Bach's cycle appear throughout the work. For example, Shostakovich begins his C major prelude, the first piece in the cycle, with exactly the same notes that Bach uses in his own C major prelude, BWV 846, which likewise begins The Well-Tempered Clavier. Likewise, the composers' second fugues (A minor for Shostakovich, C minor for Bach) utilize very similar opening rhythms for their fugue subjects (two 16th notes followed by 3 eighth notes, twice in a row). In addition to more direct quotation, Shostakovich also at points imitates the various types of preludes found in the Bach cycle (and in other, similar, Baroque compositions). For example, his A minor prelude is a figuration prelude—a prelude in which the same hand position is used throughout the piece. Examples of this abound in Baroque keyboard literature from composers such as Johann Caspar Ferdinand Fischer, from whom Bach drew inspiration for his own figuration preludes (the C major and the D minor, for example).

On a larger scale, the whole structure, ordered and sequenced as it is with no apparent extra-musical narrative, is largely a response to Bach. In Bach's cycle, however, the pieces are arranged in parallel major/minor pairs ascending the chromatic scale (C major, C minor, C major, C minor etc.), which differs from Shostakovich's Op. 87.

There are also several references and musical ideas taken from Shostakovich's own work or anticipating future work.

History
After the Second World War, Dmitri Shostakovich was Russia's most prominent composer. Although out of favour with the Soviet Communist Party, he was still sent abroad as a cultural ambassador. One such trip was to Leipzig in 1950 for a music festival marking the bicentennial of J. S. Bach's death. As part of the festival, Shostakovich was asked to sit on the judging panel for the first International Johann Sebastian Bach Competition. One of the entrants in the competition was the 26-year-old Tatiana Nikolayeva from Moscow. Though not required by competition regulations, she had come prepared to play any of the 48 preludes and fugues of The Well-Tempered Clavier on request. She won the gold medal.

Inspired by the competition and impressed by Nikolayeva's playing, Shostakovich returned to Moscow and started composing his own cycle of 24 preludes and fugues. Shostakovich worked fairly quickly, taking only three days on average to write each piece. As each was completed, he would ask Nikolayeva to come and visit him in his Moscow apartment where he would play her the latest piece. The complete work was written between 10 October 1950 and 25 February 1951. Once finished, Shostakovich dedicated the work to Nikolayeva, who undertook the public premiere in Leningrad on 23 December 1952. Shostakovich wrote out all the pieces without many corrections except the B minor prelude, with which he was dissatisfied and replaced what he had begun initially.

Analysis

Reception
Before premiering the work, Shostakovich privately performed the first half of the cycle before the Union of Composers (as was typical with new compositions during the Soviet Era) on 31 March 1951. The panel expressed great displeasure at the dissonance in some of the fugues. They also objected to the fugue in Soviet music because it was considered too Western and archaic.

This work is considered by many (e.g. music critic Alex Ross, musicologist Tanya Ursova, etc.) to be produced by the "other Shostakovich," or as a composition "for the desk drawer." According to Ross, the composer used chamber forms in the period to channel his most personal compositions, those that would not be suitable for use or approval by the Soviet government. This work is included in that group along with several string quartets.

Recordings
Shostakovich recorded 18 of the 24 pieces at five recording sessions in 1951–1952, 1956 and 1958 (EMI). He never recorded Nos. 9, 10, 11, 15, 19 or 21 but he recorded Nos. 1, 4, 5, 6, 13, 14, 18, 23 and 24 twice by doing the recording for EMI.

Tatiana Nikolayeva recorded complete sets four times, in 1962, 1987 (both originally issued by Melodiya), 1990 (Hyperion Records) and in 1992 as a filmed performance (Medici Arts). The 1962 and 1987 recordings have been reissued on several labels. She also recorded Nos. 1, 7 and 15 in 1952–1953.

Roger Woodward made the first complete recording available in the West in 1975; it was reissued on CD in September 2010 by Celestial Harmonies. Other notable complete recordings include those by Keith Jarrett, Vladimir Ashkenazy, Craig Sheppard, Konstantin Scherbakov, David Jalbert, Jenny Lin, Olli Mustonen, Peter Donohoe, and Igor Levit. Mustonen recorded the Shostakovich preludes and fugues in conjunction with those by Bach in sequences that contrast these works. His first recording was issued by RCA Victor Red Seal in 1996 and the second by Ondine Records in 2002. Levit's recording, paired with Ronald Stevenson's Passacaglia on DSCH, was issued by Sony in 2021.

References

Bibliography

External links
 Shostakovich – Op. 87 – 24 Preludes and Fugues: Analysis
 "Dmitry Shostakovich's Twenty-Four Preludes and Fugues op. 87: An Analysis and Critical Evaluation of the Printed Edition Based on the Composer's Recorded Performance", doctoral document by Denis V. Plutalov, May 2010, University of Nebraska School of Music
 , played by Shostakovich
 , played by Shostakovich
 , played by Shostakovich
 , played by Shostakovich
 , played by Shostakovich
 , played by Shostakovich
 , played by Shostakovich
 , played by Shostakovich
 , played by Tatiana Nikolayeva (1987)

Preludes and Fugues (Shostakovich)
Compositions for solo piano
Shostakovich
Shostakovich
1951 compositions
Shostakovich